Stephanie Lacoste Gularte (born 9 September 1996), also known as Fefa, is a Uruguayan footballer who plays as a centre back for Peruvian side Club Universitario de Deportes and the Uruguay women's national team.

Club career
In January 2020, Lacoste joined Portuguese club Famalicão. In June 2020, she joined Spanish club Real Oviedo. In 2021, she joined Paraguayan club Sol de América.

International career
Lacoste represented Uruguay at the 2014 South American U-20 Women's Championship. At senior level, she played the 2014 Copa América Femenina.

Honours

Club
Sportivo Limpeño
Copa Libertadores Femenina: 2016

References

External links
Stephanie Lacoste at BDFutbol

1996 births
Living people
Footballers from Montevideo
Uruguayan women's footballers
Women's association football central defenders
Club Atlético River Plate (Montevideo) players
Club Olimpia footballers
Independiente Santa Fe (women) players
Peñarol players
Club Libertad footballers
F.C. Famalicão (women) players
Real Oviedo (women) players
Club Universitario de Deportes footballers
Segunda Federación (women) players
Uruguay women's international footballers
Uruguayan expatriate women's footballers
Uruguayan expatriate sportspeople in Paraguay
Expatriate women's footballers in Paraguay
Uruguayan expatriate sportspeople in Colombia
Expatriate women's footballers in Colombia
Uruguayan expatriate sportspeople in Portugal
Expatriate women's footballers in Portugal
Uruguayan expatriate sportspeople in Spain
Expatriate women's footballers in Spain
Uruguayan expatriate sportspeople in Peru
Expatriate footballers in Peru